Caladenia corynephora, commonly known as the club-lipped spider orchid, is a plant in the orchid family Orchidaceae and is endemic to the south-west of Western Australia. It has a single erect, hairy leaf and one or two greenish-yellow and red flowers which have a labellum with a club-like tip. It is the only Western Australian caladenia with a clubbed labellum.

Description
The dorsal sepal is erect and the lateral sepals and petals are downswept, greenish-yellow with red stripes along their centres and their tips are covered with glandular hairs. The labellum is greenish-yellow with a club-shaped, red tip and a fringe of very long, narrow segments. The centre line of the labellum has four or more rows of red calli. Flowering occurs between late November and early February.

Taxonomy and naming
Caladenia corynephora was first formally described in 1971 by Alex George from a specimen collected on the banks of the Donnelly River near Pemberton. The description was published in Nuytsia. The specific epithet (corynephora) is derived from the Ancient Greek words koryne meaning "club or "mace" and phero meaning "to bear" or "to carry", referring to the clubbed labellum of this species.

Distribution and habitat
The club-lipped spider orchid grows in habitats including winter-wet swamps, on granite outcrops and in karri forest between Albany and Margaret River in the Esperance Plains, Jarrah Forest, Swan Coastal Plain and Warren biogeographic regions.

Conservation
Caladenia corynephora is classified as "not threatened" by the Western Australian Government Department of Parks and Wildlife.

References

corynephora
Endemic orchids of Australia
Orchids of Western Australia
Plants described in 2001